Onkelz wie wir… (German for Unklez (uncles) Like Us) is the fourth album by German rock band Böhse Onkelz, released in 1987. A newly recorded version of the album was released on 2 November 2007.

Track listing
Onkelz wie wir (Onkelz Like Us)
Von Glas zu Glas (From Glass to Glass)
Erinnerungen (Memories)
Bomberpilot  (Bomber Pilot) 
Dick + Durstig (Fat and Thirsty)
Falsche Propheten (False Prophets)
Am Morgen danach (The Morning After)
Schöner Tag (Beautiful Day)
Heut' Nacht (Tonight)
!

Track notes

Onkelz wie wir
Like many Onkelz songs, "Onkelz wie wir" glorifies the band.

Von Glas zu Glas
A song about alcohol, and the phenomenon of girls appearing prettier from glass to glass.

Erinnerungen
This song is an elegiac goodbye to the old days. "I love to recall those times / Times I'll never forget / But I have to live my life, go my own way / Take care, good old days / Farewell."

Bomberpilot
An ironic song about the insanity of wars.

Dick + Durstig
This song is about alcohol, as well as the band's lead singer Kevin, who weighed about 240 pounds around this time.

Falsche Propheten
This song is against following all kinds of "false prophets", whether they are religious or political figures, or the band itself.

Am Morgen danach
The morning after heavy drinking.

Schöner Tag
Another song about alcohol.

Heut' Nacht
A song about murderous obsession.

!
A fast guitar instrumental. The working title was "Speed".

References

Böhse Onkelz albums
1987 albums
2007 albums
German-language albums